Joseph Robert Goeke (born 1950) is an American lawyer who serves as a senior judge of the United States Tax Court.

Goeke received his Bachelor of Science, cum laude, from Xavier University in 1972, and his Juris Doctor from the University of Kentucky College of Law in 1975, where he was inducted into the Order of the Coif.

He worked as a trial attorney for the Internal Revenue Service from 1975-1988, for five years in New Orleans and then in Cincinnati, earning two promotions. He then left public service to become a partner, in the law firm of Mayer, Brown, Rowe & Maw, in Chicago.

On April 22, 2003, Goeke was appointed by President George W. Bush as Judge of the United States Tax Court for a term ending April 21, 2018. He assumed senior status on April 21, 2018, but continues to perform judicial duties as senior judge on recall.

In 2009, Goeke ruled that individuals may not deduct expenses on prostitutes and pornography under U.S. tax code.

Bar memberships
Admitted to the Illinois Bar and the Kentucky Bar.
U.S. District Court for the Northern District of Illinois (Trial Bar).
U.S. Court of Federal Claims.

References

Material on this page was copied from the website of the United States Tax Court, which is published by a United States government agency, and is therefore in the public domain.

1950 births
Living people
21st-century American judges
Judges of the United States Tax Court
United States Article I federal judges appointed by George W. Bush
University of Kentucky College of Law alumni
Xavier University alumni